is a Japanese television drama series concerning the life of ten high school students. It stars Kyoko Fukada as their teacher. It first aired on July 15, 2008.

Plot
Mai Aida (Kyoko Fukada) is a third year English teacher at an all-girls private school. Since fewer students are enrolling at the school, they decide to accept boys. Five boys start to attend the school. To help them adjust, Mai Aida helps them to come in contact with some girls by creating the "Social Dance Club". However, as the boys and girls at the "Social Dance Club" start to get along with each other and even fall in love, their project is not only threatened by the vice principal, but also by the devious leader of the student's council who has her very own agenda as to why she wants the club to stop.

Cast
 Kyoko Fukada as Aida Mai
 Shosuke Tanihara as Kensaku Himuro, the principal
 Ran Ito as Meiko Kageyama
 Riisa Naka as Eiri Yokoyama
 Aoi Nakamura as Kazuki Mizuki, also known as "Kazu"
 Goki Maeda as Shizuya Narita
 Aki Asakura as Hitomi Kenjou
 Kohei Norizuki as Shintarou Inai
 Mizuki Kato as Rei Suzumura
 Daisuke Yanagisawa as Kiyoshi Nagasaki
 Suzu Natsume as Maho Kameda
 Win Morisaki as Tomu Nishikawa
 Miyu Yagyu as Kana Yoshizawa

External links
  

2008 Japanese television series debuts
2008 Japanese television series endings
Japanese drama television series
Television shows written by Kazuhiko Yukawa